"Beautiful" is the fourth Japanese single by South Korean boy band 2PM. It was released on June 6, 2012 in 3 editions: CD+DVD, CD+Photobook and a Regular edition. The single was released along with the group's third live DVD "Arena Tour 2011 'Republic of 2PM'".

Composition 
"Beautiful" is an original Japanese song composed by J.Y. Park "The Asiansoul", Nice73 and Natsumi Watanabe. The B-side "Kimi ga Ireba" is also an original Japanese song, composed by the member Junho. This is the first single to include an original Japanese song as B-side.

Music video 
A teaser of the music video was released on May 14, into 2PM's official Japanese website and the full music video on May 22. It premiered on the Japanese TV network M-On!.

Promotions 
The group made the first performance of the song on the show Music Fair on June 2. The group also performed the song in NHK's show "Music Japan" on June 10 and in 2012 MTV Video Music Awards Japan, on June 23, 2012.

Track listing

Charts

Oricon

Other Charts

Beautiful

Kimi ga Ireba

Sales and certifications

Release history

References

External links
 Official website

2012 singles
Dance-pop songs
Japanese-language songs
2PM songs
2012 songs
Ariola Japan singles
Songs written by Park Jin-young